Constantine John Kanyasu (born October 17, 1969) is a Tanzanian politician and a member of the Chama Cha Mapinduzi political party. He was elected MP representing Geita in 2015. On November 10, 2018 he was appointed by President John Magufuli and on November 13, 2018 he was sworn in as Deputy Prime Minister for Natural Resources and Tourism.

He has graduated with Bachelors of Commerce at the Open University of Tanzania in 2005.

References 

1969 births
Living people
Open University of Tanzania alumni
Chama Cha Mapinduzi politicians
Tanzanian MPs 2015–2020